Diphtherocome is a genus of moths of the family Noctuidae.

Species
Diphtherocome autumnalis (Chang, 1991)
Diphtherocome abbreviata Sugi, 1968
Diphtherocome brevipennis (Hampson, 1909)
Diphtherocome burmana Berio, 1973
Diphtherocome chrysochlora (Hampson, 1898)
Diphtherocome discibrunnea (Moore, 1867)
Diphtherocome fasciata (Moore, 1888)
Diphtherocome marmorea (Leech, 1900)
Diphtherocome metaphaea (Hampson, 1909)
Diphtherocome muscosa (Hampson, 1891)
Diphtherocome pallida (Moore, 1867)
Diphtherocome pulchra (Wileman, 1912)
Diphtherocome verbenata (Distant, 1898)
Diphtherocome vigens (Walker, 1865)
Diphtherocome vivida (Leech, 1900)

References
Natural History Museum Lepidoptera genus database

Acronictinae
Noctuoidea genera